The Night Guest is a 1961 Czechoslovak drama film directed by Otakar Vávra. The film starred Rudolf Hrušínský.

Cast
 Jiří Vala as Innkeeper Emil Kalous
 Martin Růžek as Alois Remunda
 Rudolf Hrušínský as Walter Huppert
 Jana Hlaváčová as Student Jana
 Světla Amortová as Marie Kalousová, Emil's mother
 Vladimír Brabec as Policeman Vítek Hrabal
 Jiří Štíbr as Boy
 Marie Poslušná as Girl 
 Jaroslav Moučka as Driver Mikeš

References

External links
 

1961 films
Czechoslovak drama films
1960s Czech-language films
Films directed by Otakar Vávra
Czech drama films
1960s Czech films